The Battle of Lisbon may refer to:
 1147, the Siege of Lisbon during the Reconquista
 1449, the Battle of Alfarrobeira between the forces of King Afonso V and the rebellious Duke of Coimbra
 1580, the Battle of Alcântara during the War of the Portuguese Succession
 1808, the Battle of Vimeiro during the Peninsular War